Horaiclavus ordinei is a species of sea snail, a marine gastropod mollusk in the family Horaiclavidae.

Description

Distribution

References

 Bonfitto A. & Morassi M. (2014) Two new Horaiclavus (Horaiclavidae, Conoidea) species from the Indo-Pacific region. Zootaxa 3821(1): 146–150

ordinei